Bioggio Molinazzo railway station is a railway station in the municipality of Bioggio in the Swiss canton of Ticino. The station is on the metre gauge Lugano–Ponte Tresa railway (FLP), between Lugano and Ponte Tresa.

The station has a single platform, served by trains in both directions. There is also a siding, used by maintenance trains. The station was constructed and commissioned in 2001.

Services 
 the following services stop at Bioggio Molinazzo:

References

External links 
 

Railway stations in Switzerland opened in 2001
Bioggio Molinazzo
Ferrovie Luganesi stations